The Jackson State Lady Tigers basketball team is the women's basketball team that represents Jackson State University in Jackson, Mississippi. They play in the Southwestern Athletic Conference (SWAC).

Postseason results

NCAA Division I
The Lady Tigers have appeared in five NCAA Division I women's basketball tournament's and have an overall record of 0–5.

WNIT
The Lady Tigers have a WNIT record of 0–2.

AIAW Division I
The Lady Tigers made one appearance in the AIAW National Division I basketball tournament, with a combined record of 1–1.

References

External links
 

Basketball teams in Mississippi